The End of the World is a 1992 Portuguese drama film directed by João Mário Grilo. It was screened in the Un Certain Regard section at the 1993 Cannes Film Festival.

Cast
 José Viana - Augusto Henriques
 Adelaide João - Conceição das Neves
 Zita Duarte - Violante
 Santos Manuel - Guard 1
 Heitor Lourenço - Guard 2
 João Lagarto - João
 Carlos Daniel - Carlos
 Alexandra Lencastre - Maria do Carmo
 Henrique Viana - Laureano
 Mário Jacques - Prosecutor
 Rui Mendes - Judge
 Maria João Luís - Alda

References

External links

1992 films
1990s Portuguese-language films
1992 drama films
Films directed by João Mário Grilo
Films produced by Paulo Branco
Portuguese drama films